The Talk Show may refer to:

Talk show, a television programming or radio programming genre
Talk radio, a radio format
The Talk (talk show), an American talk show on CBS
The Barry Gibb Talk Show, a recurring sketch on Saturday Night Live
The Talk Show (podcast), with John Gruber

See also
 Talk show (disambiguation)
The Talk (disambiguation)
The Show (disambiguation)
List of talk show hosts